Pedro Filipe Neto da Silva Caravana (born 4 November 1974) is a Portuguese judoka.

Achievements

References
 

1974 births
Living people
Portuguese male judoka
Judoka at the 1996 Summer Olympics
Judoka at the 2000 Summer Olympics
Olympic judoka of Portugal